Fernando Pereira (born December 16, 1973) is an Angolan football player. He has played for Angola national team.

National team statistics

See also
 List of Angola international footballers

References

1973 births
Living people
Angolan footballers
Association football goalkeepers
Angola international footballers